Jean Thompson (born January 3, 1950) is an American novelist, short story writer, and teacher of creative writing. She lives in Urbana, Illinois, where she has spent much of her career, and is a professor emerita at the University of Illinois Urbana-Champaign, having also taught at San Francisco State University, Reed College, and Northwestern University.

Early life, education, and career 
Jean Thompson was born in Chicago, Illinois, and during her childhood the family lived briefly in Louisville, Kentucky and Memphis, Tennessee. She received her undergraduate degree from the University of Illinois Urbana-Champaign, and an MFA from Bowling Green State University. Her first stories were published in little magazines while she was still in her early twenties, and not long after that she began to be published in more visible venues, such as Ploughshares and The New Yorker. Her stories have appeared in The Best American Short Stories series, beginning with the 1979 edition.

Literary themes and style 
Thompson "often writes about the difficulties and complexities of love," and her work "focuses on the lives of ordinary people, often women, living in the overlooked center" of the United States.

Bibliography

Novels 

 My Wisdom: A Novel (1982), F. Watts
 Wide Blue Yonder (2001), Simon & Schuster
 City Boy (2004), Simon & Schuster
 The Year We Left Home (2011), Simon & Schuster
 The Humanity Project (2013), Blue Rider Press
 She Poured Out Her Heart (2016), Blue Rider Press
 A Cloud in the Shape of a Girl (2018), Simon & Schuster
 The Poet's House (2022), Algonquin Books

Story collections 

 Gasoline Wars (1982), University of Illinois Press
 Who Do You Love (1999), Simon & Schuster
 Throw Like A Girl: Stories (2007), Simon & Schuster
 Do Not Deny Me: Stories (2009), Simon & Schuster
 The Witch: And Other Tales Re-Told (2014), Simon & Schuster

Notable stories 

 "Applause, Applause." First appeared in Ploughshares (1977), and selected for the collections Matters of Life and Death (1983), edited by Tobias Wolff, and Children Playing Before a Statue of Hercules (2005), edited by David Sedaris
 "Paper Covers Rock." First appeared in Mademoiselle, and selected for The Best American Short Stories 1979, edited by Joyce Carol Oates.
 "Remembering Sonny." Selected for The Random Review 1982, edited by Gary Fisketjon and Jonathan Galassi.
 "Fire Dreams." Published in The New Yorker, October 31, 1988.
 "The Little Heart." Published in The New Yorker, January 27, 1992.
 "All Shall Love Me and Despair."  First published in Mid-American Review, and selected for The Best American Short Stories 1996, edited by John Edgar Wideman.

Other writing 

 "All Things Come to an End. Even My 2001 Saturn." New York Times, March 20, 2016
"Introduction." Ploughshares, Issue 123 (Spring 2014)

Awards and honors 

 1978: National Endowment for the Arts Literature Fellowship
 1984: Guggenheim Fellowship
 1999: Finalist, National Book Award for Fiction (for Who Do You Love)
 2009-2010: The Best American Short Stories and Pushcart Prize (both for "Wilderness")

References

External links 
 Author's website
Author page on publisher's website
"Interview with Jean Thompson, Author of She Poured Out Her Heart."  Book Babble.
 Randolph, Ladette. "About Jean Thompson." Ploughshares 23 (Spring 2014).

20th-century American novelists
21st-century American novelists
American women novelists
American women short story writers
University of Illinois Urbana-Champaign alumni
Novelists from Illinois
1950 births
Living people
20th-century American women
21st-century American women